Hypselecara coryphaenoides is a small species of fish in the family Cichlidae. It is native to South America.

Climate
The fish lives in tropical climates, in temperatures between 22 and 30 degrees Celsius.

References

Heroini
Fish of South America
Taxa named by Johann Jakob Heckel
Fish described in 1840